Eriochilus dilatatus subsp. magnus, commonly known as the Easter bunny orchid, is a plant in the orchid family Orchidaceae and is endemic to Western Australia. It has a single large, smooth, flattened leaf and up to twenty five dull green, red and white flowers. It is found in high rainfall areas between Perth and Albany.

Description
The flowers are dull green with red markings, except for the lateral sepals which are white. The labellum has three lobes, scattered clusters of red and white hairs and is prominently curved downwards. Flowering occurs from April to May.

Taxonomy and naming
Eriochilus dilatatus subsp. magnus was first formally described in 2006 by Stephen Hopper and Andrew Brown from a specimen collected in the Warren National Park and the description was published in Nuytsia. The specific epithet (magnus) is a Latin word meaning "large", referring to the large leaf and tall habit of this subspecies.

Distribution and habitat
The Easter bunny orchid grows in high rainfall forest and is locally common between Perth and Porongurup National Park in the Jarrah Forest, Swan Coastal Plain and Warren biogeographic regions.

Conservation
Eriochilus dilatatus subsp. magnus is classified as "not threatened" by the Western Australian Government Department of Parks and Wildlife.

References 

dilatatus
Orchids of Western Australia
Endemic orchids of Australia
Plants described in 2006
Endemic flora of Western Australia
Taxa named by Stephen Hopper